Famicom Data Recorder (HVC-008) is a compact cassette tape data interface introduced in 1984, for the Famicom which had been introduced in 1983. It is compatible with four Famicom games, for saving user-generated content to tapes. As Nintendo's first rewritable storage medium, it was replaced by the Famicom Disk System in 1986.

History
Home game consoles may present the player with the opportunity for storing game positions and original user-generated content such as custom game levels. Based on the read-only memory cartridge medium, the premium cost of easy-to-use solid-state data storage technology, such as battery-backed memory, drove the 1980s market to seek cheaper compromises. Utilizing standard compact cassette tapes, Nintendo began with the Famicom Data Recorder. A compatible game runs on cartridge and optionally allows the creation of user-generated content to be saved onto cassette tapes using this tape drive.

Available to any game developer, it was launched as a peripheral for Nintendo's Family BASIC Keyboard to save BASIC programs written by users. In addition to Family BASIC, this compatible game library is Nintendo's Programmable Series with Excitebike (1984), Mach Rider (1985), and Wrecking Crew (1985)and the third party games Castle Excellent (1989), Arkanoid - Revenge of Doh, Lode Runner (1984), and Nuts & Milk.

As production costs decreased over the years, Nintendo later developed the floppy disk based Famicom Disk System, and ASCII Corporation created an external battery-backed RAM-disk called the Turbo File.

Operation
The Famicom Data Recorder is powered either by a 6 volt adapter or 4 AA batteries. The Recorder can be used as a conventional sound recorder, and includes a built in microphone in the bottom left hand corner of the unit. The Recorder has mono sound output from a built in speaker on the top of the unit. A convenient volume control is accessible on the left hand side.

The Recorder has two data ports that use a conventional 3.5mm mono phone connector. The port on the left hand side is labeled "ear" and "load". The port on the right is labeled as "Mic" and "Save". When used as a data storage device the phone cables connected to the corresponding "write" and "save" ports on the Family BASIC keyboard.

The Data Recorder set includes an instruction manual, a data cable, a Nintendo-branded compact cassette, a 6 volt AC adapter, and a carrying handle that extends from the front bezel.

References

Nintendo Entertainment System accessories
Computer-related introductions in 1984
Japan-only video game hardware
Video game storage media